Jeremy Allanson is a justice of the Supreme Court of Western Australia. He is a graduate of Trinity College and the University of Western Australia. 
Allanson was admitted to practice as a lawyer in Western Australia in 1981 and worked for the State Solicitor's Office until 1994, when he joined the independent Bar. He was appointed as Senior Counsel in 2007.

References

Judges of the Supreme Court of Western Australia
Living people
Year of birth missing (living people)
Australian Senior Counsel